Ruza may refer to:

People
Marty Ruza, an American jewelry and accessories designer who won a Coty Award in 1970
Ruza Wenclawska (died 1977), American suffragette

Places
Ruza Urban Settlement, a municipal formation into which the Town of Ruza in Ruzsky District of Moscow Oblast, Russia is incorporated
Ruza (inhabited locality), several inhabited localities in Moscow Oblast, Russia
Ruza (river), a river in Moscow Oblast, Russia

See also
Ruža (disambiguation)